Palmerville may refer to:

Australia 

Palmerston, Australian Capital Territory, named for Palmerville, a nearby earlier settlement which was later renamed Ginninderra
Palmerville, Queensland, a former mining town in the Shire of Cook
Palmerville Station, a heritage train station in Maytown, Queensland, Australia on the Palmer River

United States 

 Palmerville, New York, United States, in St. Lawrence County